Multinational may refer to:

 Multinational corporation, a corporate organization operating in multiple countries
 Multinational force, a military body from multiple countries
 Multinational state, a sovereign state that comprises two or more nations

See also
 International (disambiguation)
 Transnational (disambiguation)
 Supranational (disambiguation)
 Subnational (disambiguation)